The BCMC College of Engineering & Technology is a private college in Jessore, Bangladesh.  The college was founded on 1 September 1999 and is run by the BCMC foundation. The college is located in Jessore district.

Programs
 Undergraduate
 Diploma programs
 Certificate computer courses
 Certificate foreign language courses

Undergraduate 
1. B Sc in Civil Engineering; 4-years program affiliated with Rajshahi University.

2. B Sc in Electrical & Electronic Engineering; 4-years program affiliated with Rajshahi University.

3. B Sc in Mechanical Engineering; 4-years program affiliated with Rajshahi University.

4. B Sc in Industrial & Production Engineering; 4-years program affiliated with Rajshahi University.

5. B Sc in Computer Science & Engineering; 4-years program affiliated with Rajshahi University.

6. B Sc in Textile Engineering; 4-years program affiliated with Rajshahi University.

Diploma programs 
1. Diploma in Civil Engineering; 4-year program affiliated with Bangladesh Technical Education Board

2. Diploma in Construction Engineering; 4-year program affiliated with Bangladesh Technical Education Board

3. Diploma in Electrical Engineering; 4-year program affiliated with Bangladesh Technical Education Board

4. Diploma in Electronics Engineering; 4-year program affiliated with Bangladesh Technical Education Board

5. Diploma in Telecommunication Engineering; 4-year program affiliated with Bangladesh Technical Education Board

6. Diploma in Electromedical Engineering; 4-year program affiliated with Bangladesh Technical Education Board

7. Diploma in Mechanical Engineering; 4-year program affiliated with Bangladesh Technical Education Board

8. Diploma in Marine Engineering; 4-year program affiliated with Bangladesh Technical Education Board

9. Diploma in Shipbuilding Engineering; 4-year program affiliated with Bangladesh Technical Education Board

10. Diploma in Computer Engineering; 4-year program affiliated with Bangladesh Technical Education Board

11. Diploma in Chemical Engineering; 4-year program affiliated with Bangladesh Technical Education Board

12. Diploma in Textile Engineering; 4-year program affiliated with Bangladesh Technical Education Board

13. Diploma in Garments Design & Pattern Making Engineering; 4-year program affiliated with Bangladesh Technical Education Board

14. Diploma in Laboratory Medical Technology; 4-year program affiliated with Bangladesh Technical Education Board

15. Diploma in Pharma Technology ; 4-year program affiliated with Bangladesh Technical Education Board

Certificate courses 
Certificate Courses under Bangladesh Technical Education Board (BTEB), Dhaka
1. Certificate in Computer Office Application; 06-months course affiliated with BTEB, Dhaka
2. Certificate in Computer Programming; 06-months course affiliated with BTEB, Dhaka
3. Certificate in Database Programming; 06-months course affiliated with BTEB, Dhaka
4. Certificate in Graphics Design; 06-months course affiliated with BTEB, Dhaka
5. Certificate in Hardware & Networking; 06-months course affiliated with BTEB, Dhaka
6. Certificate in Auto CAD 2D/3D; 06-months course affiliated with BTEB, Dhaka
7. Certificate in Apparel Merchandising; 06-months course affiliated with BTEB, Dhaka
8. Certificate in Driving Cum Auto Mechanics; 06-months course affiliated with BTEB, Dhaka

Certificate Foreign Language Courses
1. Special Spoken English Course; 03-months course
2. English Language Training Course (Spoken & Written); 06-months course
3. Spanish Language Training Course (Spoken & Written); 06-months course
4. German (Deutsch) Language Training Course (Spoken & Written); 06-months course
5. Arabic Language Training Course (Spoken & Written); 06-months course
6. Japanese Language Training Course (Spoken & Written); 06-months course
7. Korean Language Training Course (Spoken & Written); 06-months course
8. Chinese Language Training Course (Spoken & Written); 06-months course

References

External links
 Official website of BCMC College

1991 establishments in Bangladesh
Engineering universities and colleges in Bangladesh
Technological institutes of Bangladesh